Anglican congregations in Norway (Norwegian: Den anglikanske kirke i Norge) is a Protestant free church in Norway with a total official membership of 1,500 people in 2009 in 4 congregations, in Oslo, Bergen, Trondheim and Stavanger.

Peter Hogarth, who had served for some years as the resident priest in Stavanger, also serving Bergen, was arrested and sentenced to six months in prison in 2019 for possession of images of child abuse

See also 
 Christianity in Norway
 Bergen Anglican Church
 St Edmund's Church, Oslo
 St. Olaf's Church, Balestrand

External links 
 Stavanger Congregation
 Trondheim Congregation

References